The 1912 United States House of Representatives election in Arizona was held on November 5, 1912, to elect the U.S. representative from Arizona's at-large congressional district to represent the U.S. state of Arizona in the 63rd Congress. The election coincided with other elections, including the U.S. presidential election, as well as various state and local elections.

Incumbent Carl Hayden was elected to his first full term as a congressman after winning 54% of the vote in 1911. He faced future Arizona governor Thomas Edward Campbell, as well as Robert Fisher, a nominee of the newly formed Progressive Party.

General election

See also
 1912 United States House of Representatives elections
 63rd United States Congress

References

1912
Arizona
1912 Arizona elections